Březí is a municipality and village in Prague-East District in the Central Bohemian Region of the Czech Republic. It has about 600 inhabitants.

History

The first written mention of Březí is from 1303.

References

External links

 (in Czech)

Villages in Prague-East District